The 1986 E3 Harelbeke was the 29th edition of the E3 Harelbeke cycle race and was held on 22 March 1986. The race started and finished in Harelbeke. The race was won by Eric Vanderaerden of the Panasonic team.

General classification

References

1986 in Belgian sport
1986